Afrikanische Straße is a station in the Wedding district of Berlin which serves the  line and is operated by the BVG. The station is located under the Müllerstraße, one of the district's major shopping streets and thoroughfares, but named for another major street nearby. The BVG uses the station under the internal abbreviation Afr; the train station is 631 meters from the Kurt-Schumacher-Platz U-Bahn Station and 587 meters from the Rehberge U-Bahn Station.

Originally, the station was not in the plans for the expansion. But the post-war development as well as the Friedrich Ebert settlement built between 1929 and 1931 justified a station. It opened on 3 May 1956, along with the rest of the route between Seestraße and Kurt-Schumacher-Platz. There is a bus depot of the BVG near the station and it is often used by staff for access to the depot.

In the course of a basic renovation, the station received new and larger wall tiles in 2016, which are light blue. The former advertising space on the siding walls now carry dark blue bordered African motifs, as well as the departures from the mezzanine floors. The previous suffix Friedrich-Ebert-Siedlung (settlement) is no longer used.

U6 (Berlin U-Bahn) stations
Buildings and structures in Mitte
Railway stations in Germany opened in 1956